The 1944 NSWRFL season was the thirty-seventh season of the New South Wales Rugby Football League premiership, Sydney’s top-level rugby league competition, and Australia’s first. Eight teams from across the city contested the premiership during the season which culminated in Balmain’s victory over Newtown in the grand final.

Teams
 Balmain, formed on January 23, 1908, at Balmain Town Hall
 Canterbury-Bankstown
 Eastern Suburbs, formed on January 24, 1908, at Paddington Town Hall
 Newtown, formed on January 14, 1908
 North Sydney, formed on February 7, 1908
 South Sydney, formed on January 17, 1908, at Redfern Town Hall
 St. George, formed on November 8, 1920, at Kogarah School of Arts
 Western Suburbs, formed on February 4, 1908

Ladder

Finals
Newtown looked set for back-to-back titles after finishing as minor premiers. Both Newtown and Balmain won their respective semi-finals with the Bluebags blitzing St George by 55 points to 7, which was to remain the Dragons’ largest losing margin until 1994 and the largest margin in a finals match until 2019. However injuries and war duties then ravaged the side including the key losses of Len Smith and Herb Narvo who had starred for them all season. Balmain thus overcame Newtown 19–16 in the final, enabling Newtown a “right of challenge”.

Grand Final

Newtown exercised their “right of challenge” as minor premiers and called for a Grand Final. In a low-scoring affair Balmain's representative centre Joe Jorgenson kicked two late penalty goals to give the Tigers a 12–8 win and their eighth title.
 
Balmain 12 (Tries: Devery, K Parkinson. Goals: Jorgenson 3)

defeated

Newtown 8 (Tries: Farrell, McLean. Goals: Kirk)

Player statistics
The following statistics are as of the conclusion of Round 14.

Top 5 point scorers

Top 5 try scorers

Top 5 goal scorers

References

External links
 Rugby League Tables - Notes AFL Tables
 Rugby League Tables - Season 1944 AFL Tables
 Premiership History and Statistics RL1908
 Finals lineups and results Hunterlink site
 1944 Labor Daily Cup at rleague.com
 Results: 1941-1950 at rabbitohs.com.au

New South Wales Rugby League premiership
Nswrfl season